Anthony Ryan Dudley (born 15 September 1996) is an English footballer who plays as a forward for National League North club Chester.

Club career

Bury
Dudley made his Football League debut for Bury in EFL League Two on 18 January 2014, coming on as a substitute for Tom Soares in the 87th minute against Burton Albion at Gigg Lane.

Guiseley
After back-to-back loan spells with National League team Guiseley, with whom he made 16 appearances and scored 7 goals.

Macclesfield Town
Dudley signed for another National League side on loan Macclesfield Town, in January 2017. He joined Macclesfield as part of the transfer of Jack Mackreth to Bury.

Salford City
In June 2017 he joined Salford City on a two-year contract, valid from the expiry of his contract at Bury at the end of the month.

In June 2019 he was released by Salford.

Chester
On 26 July 2018 he joined Chester on a season-long loan along with fellow player Danny Livesey, reuniting them with their former Salford managers. At the end of the season, Chester confirmed both players had returned to their parent club.

In June 2019, Dudley signed for National League North club Chester on a permanent one-year deal.

Career statistics

Honours
Macclesfield Town
FA Trophy runner-up: 2016–17

References

External links

Living people
1996 births
Footballers from Manchester
Bury F.C. players
Guiseley A.F.C. players
Macclesfield Town F.C. players
Association football forwards
Salford City F.C. players
English footballers
Chester F.C. players
English Football League players
National League (English football) players